Dyseuaresta caracasana is a species of tephritid or fruit flies in the genus Dyseuaresta of the family Tephritidae.

Distribution
Venezuela.

References

Tephritinae
Insects described in 1982
Diptera of South America